Andrei Albinovich Rapeika (born 21 September 1971) is a former Belarusian professional footballer.

Club career
He made his professional debut in the Belarusian Premier League in 1992 for Shakhtyor Soligorsk . He played 6 games in the 1997 UEFA Intertoto Cup for FC Lokomotiv Nizhny Novgorod.

References

1971 births
Living people
Belarusian footballers
Belarusian expatriate footballers
Expatriate footballers in Russia
Russian Premier League players
FC Lokomotiv Nizhny Novgorod players
FC Dynamo Stavropol players
FC Khimik-Arsenal players
FC Shakhtyor Soligorsk players
FC Granit Mikashevichi players
FC Slutsk players
Association football midfielders